David Grace (born 1949) is a British racing driver.

David Grace may also refer to:

 David Grace (basketball), American basketball coach
 David Grace (snooker player) (born 1985), English snooker player
 pen name of American author David M. Alexander (born 1945)